The Beaumont-Cherry Valley Recreation and Park District is a special district in Riverside County, California serving the communities of Beaumont and Cherry Valley.  Established in 1972, the District provides parks, park facilities and recreational programs to the local communities.

Management of the Bogart Regional Park was transferred from Riverside County Parks to the District in 2019, and is the largest facility overseen by the District.

See also
 Special Districts in California

References

External links
Beaumont-Cherry Valley Recreation and Park District Home page

Parks in Riverside County, California
Park districts in California
Government in Riverside County, California
San Gorgonio Pass
1972 establishments in California
Government agencies established in 1972